Christopher Hamilton Bidmead (born 18 January 1941) is a British writer and journalist.

Bidmead trained as an actor at the Royal Academy of Dramatic Arts (RADA), later playing several roles on stage, television and radio. By the early 1970s he was scriptwriting for Thames Television, producing material for Harriet's Back in Town and Rooms. Up until 1979, he was a journalist.  He had contributed some articles to New Scientist.

In 1979, Robert Banks Stewart recommended him for the post of script editor on Doctor Who. Bidmead was primarily responsible for a "back to basics" approach for his yearlong tenure on Doctor Who, attempting to curb the more playful and fantasy oriented approach of his predecessor Douglas Adams in favour of a more naturalistic and scientific style of presentation. Most noticeable in the more serious portrayal of Tom Baker's Doctor, this approach proved controversial and ratings suffered, although this has been attributed to the tough timeslot for Bidmead's season which saw the show competing against Buck Rogers in the 25th Century on ITV. Very much a product of its time, Bidmead's writings for Doctor Who demonstrate an increasing awareness of computer technology, typified by his complex serial Logopolis which served to write out the Fourth Doctor. After a year as script editor he returned to freelance work. This included writing two more Doctor Who serials for Peter Davison's Doctor (Castrovalva and Frontios) as well as producing novelisations of all three of these Doctor Who stories.

He has continued his career in computer journalism, writing regularly (as Chris Bidmead) for Personal Computer World, PC Plus and other computer magazines, and specialising in Linux tools.  Occasionally he has contributed more speculative or philosophical pieces for publications such as New Scientist, and recently he has worked as a journalist producing material for Wired magazine.

In August 2006, it was announced in Doctor Who Magazine that Bidmead would be writing a Doctor Who audio play, Renaissance of the Daleks, for release through Big Finish Productions in March 2007. An audio play with that title was subsequently released, with a "From a Story By" credit for Bidmead. In recent years he has contributed voiceover commentaries and interviews for numerous DVD and Blu-ray releases of Doctor Who serials with which he was involved.

Proposed Doctor Who stories

The Hollows of Time
Submitted on 19 June 1984, it would see the Doctor losing some of his memories throughout time. He would adapt the story to Big Finish Productions in June 2010.

Pinacotheca
Also known as "The Last Adventure", this four-part story, was submitted on 29 October 1986 as a Trial of a Timelord story. The story would see the Doctor having been on trial by the Timelords, and investigating the planet Pinacotheca, that has a museum showing places and times in the universe .

References

External links

1941 births
Alumni of RADA
British television writers
Living people
English male journalists
British male television writers
People from Bolton